American Epic: The Collection is a 100-track, 5-CD box set of American roots music performances from the 1920s and 1930s. It was compiled by film director Bernard MacMahon to accompany the release of his American Epic documentary film series. The box features 100 songs by 100 different artists and has been acclaimed by many critics as a worthy successor to the Anthology of American Folk Music and one of the best box sets to ever be released. The box set won particular acclaim for the song selection and the sound quality of the transfers of vintage 78rpm records.

Background 
The American Epic collection was conceived by director Bernard MacMahon during the ten years of research preparing the American Epic documentary series. “When we set out to make this set”, MacMahon explained “the first task was culling a representative sample of 100 tracks from that vast body of [1920s and 1930s] recordings. We wanted to display the phenomenal breadth of styles that were preserved and touch on the most influential artists—but, most of all, we wanted to convey the excitement and power of the music, to provide an experience that would capture the attention of other modern listeners as it did ours.” The box set was intended to be a definitive portrait of the roots recording boom of the late 20s and early 30s. It was seen by the production as an important supplementary feature to the documentary films for appreciating the breadth of the music recorded at the time and drawing attention to important artists who could not be featured in the films.

Compilation 
The compilation spans from 1926 to 1936 with two pre-electric recordings  – the 1922 Eck Robertson recording of “Sallie Gooden” and 1916 Don Richardson recording of “Arkansas Traveler” – which the liner notes posit as being the first commercial country recording. MacMahon commented that his intention was to “to display the phenomenal breadth of styles that were preserved and touch on the most influential artists” adding that “when conflicts arose between our passion and our mission, we chose to follow our passion. We wanted to present music that was beyond time or classification, that sounded as if it could have been recorded last week, and that would startle and excite both unfamiliar and expert listeners.” The album covers a very broad range of rural and vernacular American styles; Cajun, country, blues, folk, Hawaiian, Hispanic, Mexican, Native American, Puerto Rican, Tex-Mex. MacMahon spent years listening to the catalogues of hundreds of artists from the era to whittle down the 100 songs. He made many trips to the homes of record collectors like Michael Kieffer, John Tefteller and Richard Nevins to hear very rare records that had never been reissued.

Sequencing 
The box set was organized by the location of the recording sessions with each of the five discs documenting a different region; The Southeast, Atlanta, New York, The Midwest, and The Deep South & The West. The album liner notes explained that the methodology “mirrors the process by which this music came to us: Robert Johnson was from Mississippi, but he traveled over much of the United States and made his recordings in Dallas and San Antonio.” The notes added that “historians often emphasize the travels of the record scouts who fanned out across the South in search of unique artists, but while recognizing and documenting those efforts, we wanted to recall that it was most often the artists themselves who traveled, sometimes thousands of miles—and that is why we know them today.”

Restoration 

New sound restoration techniques developed for the American Epic film production were utilized to restore the 100 songs on the album. The 78rpm disc transfers were made by sound engineer Nicholas Bergh using ‘reverse engineering’ techniques garnered from working with the original 1920s recording equipment on The American Epic Sessions along with meticulous sound restoration undertaken by Peter Henderson and Joel Tefteller to reveal greater fidelity, presence and clarity to these early Western Electric recordings than had been heard before. Nicholas Bergh commented “the recordings in this set are special since they utilize the earliest and simplest type of electric recording equipment used for commercial studio work. As a result, they have an unrivaled immediacy to the sound.”

Some of the recordings were repressed from the original metal parts, which the production located whilst researching the films. Peter Henderson explained “in some cases we were lucky enough to get some metal parts – that’s the originals where they were cut to wax and the metal was put into the grooves and the discs were printed from those back in the ‘20s. Some of those still exist – Sony had some of them in their vaults – [but it only amounted to] 15-20 discs out of the whole.”

Design 
The album was housed in a black leatherette 100-page book embossed with seven red stripes representing the seven red stripes of the American flag and embossed with the image of a small wind-up Victor gramophone representing the workingman's record player. The book opened with an essay outlining the new historical information about the American Epic recordings unearthed in the film production. The book was split into five chapters with each chapter opening with a photograph of the site of a recording studio from the region the disc was profiling. Each of the 100 songs were accompanied by a portrait of the artist or promotional artwork, lyrics and a quote from either the artist or someone who knew them personally. The album featured many previously unpublished photos and images of performers who had not been seen before. It was the first time many of the lyrics had been transcribed and some of the quotes unearthed commented on performers about whom nothing had been previously known.

Release 
The album was released on May 12, 2017, a month prior to the broadcast of the American Epic documentary films.

Critical reception 

The album received widespread critical acclaim for the song selection, the breadth of musical styles covered, and the sound restoration. David Fricke in Rolling Stone voted the album as a “Reissue of the Year” and wrote that it was a “must-hear story of aspiring native, immigrant and underclass voices given permanence for the first time. This soundtrack expands the film to a truly national chorale: Appalachian singers, Cajun dance bands, blues genies and Native American chanters and more. Want to hear America be great again? Drop the needle.” Greil Marcus in The Village Voice described it as “a magnificent 100-track compendium, paralleling Harry Smith’s 1952 Anthology of American Folk Music but expanding on it, with a remastering I can only call profound. Performances you might think you knew sound as if you’ve never heard them before.” Robert Christgau in Noisey gave the album an A grade and in his annual Dean's List named it his #16 album of 2017 calling it “important and indeed brilliant.” Ian Anderson in fRoots commented “you haven’t really heard these tracks at all. Not like this. The ‘reverse engineering’ transfers by Nicholas Bergh and subsequent restorations are so startlingly better, practically everything you will ever have experienced from this era can be discounted. The clarity will have you on the edge of your seat. Suddenly, legendary artists are in the room with you.” Randy Lewis in the Los Angeles Times observed that the album had achieved an “unprecedented audio fidelity.” Robert Baird in Stereophile described the album as “spectacular” and added that “what's most interesting for audiophiles is the huge improvement in the quality of the sound coming from these 78 transfers, both in the film and especially in the 5-CD boxed set of the same name.” Ed Whitelock in PopMatters wrote “album compiler and editor Bernard MacMahon has done a superb job of curating a collection that truly captures the breadth of American rural music of the 1920s (more so, even, than Smith did with his famous Anthology). American Epic: The Collection claims a comprehensiveness of representation unmatched by any other anthology of this music. For those interested in a one-stop experience of the wonder and variety that is American rural music from the 1920s, American Epic: The Collection provides an adventurous, satisfying, and ultimately definitive collection.” Blair Jackson in Acoustic Guitar summarized “this comprehensive five-disc, 100-song treasury is one of the most important compilations of its kind ever released—perhaps since Harry Smith’s seminal Anthology of American Folk Music in 1952. It’s a marvelous history lesson, but even more, it’s a glimpse into the very heart of America, as emotionally relevant today as it was nearly a century ago.”

Track listing

Disc One: The Southeast (59:10)

Disc two: Atlanta (52:47)

Disc three: New York City (63:19)

Disc four: The Midwest (74:08)

Disc five: The Deep South and the West (66:33)

Personnel 

 Clarence Ashley: banjo, vocal (disc 1, track 1) guitar, vocal (disc 2, track 9)
 Will Shade: guitar, vocal (disc 1, track 2)
 Ben Ramey: kazoo (disc 1, track 2)
 Charlie Burse: guitar, vocal (disc 1, track 2)
 Jab Jones: jug (disc 1, track 2)
 Booker T. Washington White: vocal, guitar (disc 1, track 3)
 Hoyt Ming: fiddle (disc 1, track 4)
 Troy Ming: mandolin (disc 1, track 4)
 Rozelle Ming: guitar (disc 1, track 4)
 A. D. Coggin: calls (disc 1, track 4)
 Frank Stokes: vocal, guitar (disc 1, track 5; disc 4, track 12)
 Dan Sane: (disc 1, track 5; disc 4, track 12)
 Andrew Baxter: violin (disc 1, track 6)
 Jim Baxter: vocal, guitar (disc 1, track 6)
 Alfred G. Karnes: vocal, guitar (disc 1, track 7)
 Garfield Akers: vocal, guitar (disc 1, track 8)
 Joe Callicott: guitar (disc 1, track 8)
 Bascom Lamar Lunsford: vocal, banjo (disc 1, track 9)
 Clement Bentley: guitar (disc 1, track 10)
 Whistler (Buford Threlkeld): vocal, guitar (disc 1, track 11)
 Luther Nichols: violin (disc 1, track 11)
 Willie Black: banjo (disc 1, track 11)
 Rudolph Thompson: vocal, jug (disc 1, track 11)
 James Watts: vocal (disc 1, track 11)
 Dick Weems: fiddle (disc 1, track 12)
 Frank Weems: fiddle (disc 1, track 12)
 Alvin Conder: banjo, vocals (disc 1, track 12)
 Jesse Weems: violin, cello (disc 1, track 12)
 Mattie Delaney: vocal, guitar (disc 1, track 13)
 Gus Cannon: banjo, jug, vocal (disc 1, track 14) vocal, banjo (disc 4, track 3)
 Hosea Woods: guitar, vocal, kazoo (disc 1, track 14)
 Noah Lewis: harmonica (disc 1, track 14)
 Sara Carter: vocal, autoharp (disc 1, track 15)
 Maybelle Carter: vocal, guitar (disc 1, track 15)
 A. P. Carter: vocal (disc 1, track 15)
 Jim Jackson: vocal, guitar (disc 1, track 16)
 Columbus Fruge: vocal, accordion (disc 1, track 17)
 Tommy Johnson: vocal, guitar (disc 1, track 18)
 Charlie McCoy: guitar (disc 1, track 18)
 James Preston Nester: vocal, banjo (disc 1, track 19) 
 Norman Edmonds: fiddle (disc 1, track 19)
 Josephine Crawford: vocal (disc 2, track 1)
 Elder John E Burch: vocal (disc 2, track 1)
 Triumph Church Choir: vocals (disc 2, track 1)
 Julius Daniels: guitar, vocal (disc 2, track 2)
 Earl Johnson: fiddle, vocal (disc 2, track 3)
 Emmett Bankston: banjo, vocal (disc 2, track 3)
 Lee ‘Red’ Henderson: guitar (disc 2, track 3)
 James M. Gates: vocal (disc 2, track 4)
 Jimmie Rodgers: vocal (disc 2, track 5)
 C. L. Hutchison: cornet (disc 2, track 5)
 James Rickard: clarinet (disc 2, track 5)
 John Westbrook: steel guitar (disc 2, track 5)
 Dean Bryan: guitar (disc 2, track 5)
 George MacMillan: string bass (disc 2, track 5)
 Claude Grant: guitar, vocals (disc 2, track 6)
 Jack Grant: mandolin (disc 2, track 6)
 Jack Pierce: fiddle (disc 2, track 6)
 Claude Slagle: banjo (disc 2, track 6)
 Thomas Jackson Denson: lead vocal tenor (disc 2, track 7)
 Seaborn Denson: bass (disc 2, track 7)
 Jerusha Henrietta Denson-Edwards: alto (disc 2, track 7)
 Aunt Annie: soprano (disc 2, track 7)
 Whit Denson: tenor (disc 2, track 7)
 J. C. Brown: vocal (disc 2, track 7)
 Amedée Breaux: accordion, vocal (disc 2, track 8)
 Ophy Breaux: fiddle (disc 2, track 8 & 12)
 Cléoma Breaux: guitar (disc 2, track 8 & 12; disc 5, track 18)
 Dock Walsh: banjo, vocal (disc 2, track 9)
 Garley Foster: harmonica, guitar (disc 2, track 9)
 Barbecue Bob: vocal, guitar (disc 2, track 10)
 Eddie Head: vocals (disc 2, track 11)
 Joseph Falcon: accordion (disc 2, track 12) vocal, accordion (disc 5, track 18)
 John Dilleshaw: speaking, guitar (disc 2, track 13)
 Harry Kiker: fiddle (disc 2, track 13)
 Shorty Lindsay: tenor banjo, speaking (disc 2, track 13)
 Pink Lindsey: string bass, speaking (disc 2, track 13)
 Hubert A. Nelson: steel guitar, vocal (disc 2, track 14)
 James D. Touchstone: guitar, vocal (disc 2, track 14)
 Willie Walker: vocal, guitar (disc 2, track 15)
 Sam Brooks: guitar, vocal (disc 2, track 15)
 Leonard Rutherford: fiddle (disc 2, track 16)
 Richard D. Burnett: banjo, vocal effect (disc 2, track 16)
 Blind Willie McTell: vocal, guitar (disc 2, track 17)
 Diosa Costello: vocal (disc 3, track 1)
 Enrique: group member (disc 3, track 1)
 Cándido: group member (disc 3, track 1)
 Lara: group member (disc 3, track 1)
 A. Baldrich: musical director (disc 3, track 2)
 Guty Cárdenas: vocal, guitar (disc 3, track 3)
 Lencho: vocal, guitar (disc 3, track 3)
 Emmett Miller: vocal (disc 3, track 4)
 Dan Fitch: vocal (disc 3, track 4)
 Leo McConville: trumpet (disc 3, track 4)
 Tommy Dorsey: trombone (disc 3, track 4)
 Jimmy Dorsey: clarinet, alto sax (disc 3, track 4)
 Arthur Schutt: piano (disc 3, track 4)
 Eddie Lang: guitar (disc 3, track 4)
 Stan King: drums (disc 3, track 4)
 Big Bill Broonzy: vocals, guitar (disc 3, track 5)
 Joe Evans: vocal, guitar or mandolin (disc 3, track 6)
 Arthur McClain: vocal, guitar or mandolin (disc 3, track 6)
 Lead Belly: vocal, guitar (disc 3, track 7)
 Mississippi John Hurt: vocals, guitar (disc 3, track 8)
 Blind Gary Davis: vocal, guitar (disc 3, track 9)
 Rev. F.W. McGee: vocal (disc 3, track 10)
 Kotsheptiwa: vocal (disc 3, track 11)
 Salaptotsi: vocal (disc 3, track 11)
 Si’tala: vocal (disc 3, track 11)
 Qömakwaptiwa: vocal (disc 3, track 11)

 Pongya: vocal (disc 3, track 11)
 Mike Hanapi: vocal, steel guitar (disc 3, track 12)
 Bob Nawahine: vocal, bass (disc 3, track 12)
 David Burrows: steel guitar (disc 3, track 12)
 Dave Munson: vocal, rhythm guitar (disc 3, track 12)
 Charlie Poole: vocal, banjo (disc 3, track 13)
 Odell Smith: fiddle (disc 3, track 13)
 Roy Harvey: guitar (disc 3, track 13)
 Frank Hutchison: vocals, guitar, harmonica (disc 3, track 14)
 Ernest V. Stoneman: vocal, guitar (disc 3, track 15)
 Kahle Brewer: fiddle (disc 3, track 15)
 Bolen Frost: banjo (disc 3, track 15)
 Buell Kazee: vocal (disc 3, track 16)
 Bert Hirsch: fiddle (disc 3, track 16)
 Carson Robison: guitar (disc 3, track 16)
 Dock Boggs: vocal, banjo (disc 3, track 17)
 Uncle Dave Macon: vocal, banjo (disc 3, track 18)
 Sam McGee: guitar, vocal (disc 3, track 18)
 Kirk McGee: fiddle, vocal (disc 3, track 18)
 Mazy Todd: fiddle (disc 3, track 18)
 “Uncle” Bunt Stephens: fiddle (disc 3, track 19)
 Eck Robertson: fiddle (disc 3, track 20)
 Don Richardson: violin (disc 3, track 21)
 Lane Hardin: vocal, guitar (disc 4, track 1)
 Charley Patton: vocal, guitar (disc 4, track 2)
 Blind Blake: guitar (disc 4, track 3) speaking, guitar (disc 4, track 4)
 Charlie Spand: piano (disc 4, track 4)
 Blind Lemon Jefferson: vocal, guitar (disc 4, track 5)
 Dempsey Jones: ukulele, vocal (disc 4, track 6)
 Phil Featherstone: mandolin (disc 4, track 6)
 Bumble Bee Slim: vocal (disc 4, track 7)
 Memphis Minnie: vocal, guitar (disc 4, track 7)
 Black Bob: piano (disc 4, track 7)
 Ma Rainey: vocal (disc 4, track 8)
 Georgia Tom Dorsey: piano (disc 4, track 8)
 Martell Pettiford: banjo (disc 4, track 8)
 Herman Brown: kazoo, washboard, drum (disc 4, track 8)
 Carl Reid: jug (disc 4, track 8)
 Ervin Williamson: vocal, guitar (disc 4, track 9)
 Arnold Williamson: vocal, fiddle (disc 4, track 9)
 Arnold Curry: banjo (disc 4, track 9)
 Kirk: backing vocals (disc 4, track 9)
 Geeshie Wiley: vocal, guitar (disc 4, track 10)
 Earl McDonald: jug (disc 4, track 11)
 Henry Clifford: jug (disc 4, track 11)
 Clifford Hayes: violin (disc 4, track 11)
 Lockwood Lewis: alto saxophone (disc 4, track 11)
 Cal Smith: banjo (disc 4, track 11)
 Freddie Smith: banjo (disc 4, track 11
 Curtis Hayes: banjo (disc 4, track 11)
 Blind Willie Davis: vocals, guitar (disc 4, track 13)
 Sleepy John Estes: vocal (disc 4, track 14)
 Hammie Nixon: harmonica (disc 4, track 14)
 Sam Collins: vocal, guitar (disc 4, track 15)
 Willie Brown: vocal, guitar (disc 4, track 16)
 Henry Thomas “Ragtime Texas”: guitar, vocal, reed pipes (disc 4, track 17)
 Curt Massey: fiddle (disc 4, track 18)
 Larry Wellington: accordion, piano (disc 4, track 18)
 Milt Mabie: string bass (disc 4, track 18)
 Dick Justice: vocal, guitar (disc 4, track 19)
 William Moore: guitar, vocal (disc 4, track 20)
 Delma Lachney: fiddle (disc 4, track 21)
 Blind Uncle Gaspard: guitar (disc 4, track 21)
 Son House: vocal, guitar (disc 4, track 22)
 Skip James: vocal, guitar (disc 4, track 23)
 Robert Johnson: vocal, guitar (disc 5, track 1)
 Lydia Mendoza: vocal, guitar (disc 5, track 2)
 Polite ‘Frenchy’ Christian: cornet (disc 5, track 3)
 Percy Darensbourg: banjo (disc 5, track 3)
 Robert (Tim) Wilkins: vocal, guitar (disc 5, track 4)
 Son Joe (Ernest Lawlers): guitar (disc 5, track 4)
 Kid Spoons’: spoons (disc 5, track 4)
 Amédée Ardoin: accordion, vocal (disc 5, track 5)
 Dennis McGee: fiddle (disc 5, track 5)
 Charles Stripling: fiddle (disc 5, track 6)
 Ira Stripling: guitar (disc 5, track 6)
 Jaybird Coleman: vocal (disc 5, track 7)
 Sol K. Bright: vocal, steel guitar (disc 5, track 8)
 Ray Kinney: vocal, ukulele (disc 5, track 8)
 Walter Vinson: guitar, vocal (disc 5, track 9)
 Lonnie Chatman violin (disc 5, track 9)
 Richard ‘Rabbit’ Brown: guitar, vocals (disc 5, track 10)
 Henry Hall: fiddle (disc 5, track 11)
 Harold Hall: vocal (disc 5, track 11)
 Clarence Hall: guitar (disc 5, track 11)
 Archie ‘Prince’ Albert Hunt: fiddle, vocal (disc 5, track 12)
 Oscar Harper: guitar (disc 5, track 12)
 Berthmost Montet: accordion, vocal (disc 5, track 13)
 Joswell Dupuis: guitar (disc 5, track 13)
 Blind Willie Johnson: guitar, vocals (disc 5, track 14)
 Sol Ho’opi’i: vocal, steel guitar (disc 5, track 15)
 Lani McIntire: guitar (disc 5, track 15)
 Glenwood Leslie: ukulele (disc 5, track 15)
 Velma Truett: guitar (disc 5, track 16)
 Harry George: guitar (disc 5, track 16)
 Roosevelt Graves: guitar (disc 5, track 17)
 Uaroy Graves: tambourine, vocals (disc 5, track 17)
 Víctor Sánchez: vocal, guitar (disc 5, track 19)
 Fernando Linares: vocal, guitar (disc 5, track 19)
 Washington Phillips: vocal, unknown instrument (disc 5, track 20)
 Bernard MacMahon: editor, compiler, producer
 Nicholas Bergh: 78rpm transfers, mastering
 Peter Henderson: restoration, mastering, producer
 Duke Erikson: restoration, mastering, producer
 Joel Tefteller:  restoration, mastering
 John Polito: mastering
 Ellis Burman: mastering
 Allison McGourty: producer
 Adam Block: producer
 Patrick Ferris: associate producer
 Jack McLean: associate producer
 Nat Strimpopulos: artwork

References

Footnotes

Bibliography 
 Wald, Elijah & McGourty, Allison & MacMahon, Bernard. American Epic: The First Time America Heard Itself. New York: Touchstone, 2017. .

External links 
 Official American Epic website

Folk albums by American artists
2017 compilation albums
Country music compilation albums
Folk compilation albums
Compilation albums by American artists
Blues compilation albums
Country albums by American artists
Collection
Collection
Collection
Collection